Porphyrosela minuta is a moth of the family Gracillariidae. It is known from Argentina, Brazil and Chile. It has been recently introduced in North America and is found in several states, as far north as Maryland.

The larvae feed on Medicago sativa and Trifolium species (including Trifolium pratense). They mine the leaves of their host plant.

References

Links
Bugguide. Info and images

Lithocolletinae
Moths described in 1953